Marion Howard Dunham (Howard; December 6, 1842 – December 27, 1921) was an American teacher, temperance activist, and suffragist. She entered upon the temperance field in 1877 with the inauguration of the red ribbon movement in her state of Iowa, but believing in more permanent effort, she was the prime agitator in the organization of the local Woman's Christian Temperance Union (W.C.T.U.). In 1883, she was elected state superintendent of the Department of Scientific Temperance and held the office for four years lecturing to institutes and general audiences on that subject most of the time. She procured the "Prohibitory law of the state of Iowa", in February 1886. When the Iowa State Temperance Union began to display its opposition to the national W.C.T.U., she came to be considered a leader on the side of the minority who adhered to the national and when the majority in the state union seceded from the national union October 16, 1890, she was elected president of those remaining auxiliary to that body. She spent a large part of her time in the field lecturing on temperance. 

In addition to her temperance work, she was always a radical equal suffragist, who spoke and wrote much on that subject. A Christian socialist and an outspoken militant, Dunhan was an asset to the Socialist women's movement.

Early life and education
Marion H. Howard was born at Burton, Ohio, December 6, 1842. She passed the first part of her life upon a farm. Her parents were Justice Howard and Clara Taylor Howard.

She was educated in the public schools till the age of fifteen, when she became a teacher, using the money thus earned to complete her education in various Ohio institutions.

Career
She taught in the public schools of Chicago from 1806 to 1873.

In 1873, she  married Charles A. Dunham, an architect of Burlington, Iowa,  and went  with  her  husband  to  reside  in that  city. She took part in the Red Ribbon movement there in 1877, and was the prime facilitator in the organization of the Burlington W.C.T.U. She  was  elected  president,  and later  became  president  of  the  county  and district organizations. In 1883,  she  was elected  State superintendent  of  the  department  of  Scientific Temperance.  She spent  the  next  four years largely  in  lecturing  on that  subject  to  institutes and  various  other  assemblies. During  that period, she procured  from the  Legislature  the Iowa law of  1886.  In  1890,  when  the Iowa W.C.T.U. withdrew from  the  national  organization, Dunham decided  to  remain with the minority, and  she  was  elected  State  president  of  the remnant that  still adhered  to  the  National W.C.T.U. She was for a number of years almost the only W.C.T.U.  speaker  in  Iowa  representing the national body.  She  labored to bring about an adjustment of the differences. At  length  her  efforts  were rewarded with  success in the reuniting of both branches.

She afterward moved back to Chicago, where she was elected president of the Cook County, Illinois W.C.T.U. She served for many years  as a member of the Board of Trustees, and also as secretary, of the Woman’s Temple of Chicago.

Dunham wrote and spoke much on the suffrage issue. She was a Christian socialist, deeply interested in all reforms that promised to better the social system and the conditions of life for the multitudes. Dunham served as Corresponding Secretary of the Women's National Socialist Union.

Personal life
Some  years  before her  death, she resigned her official positions and took up her residence in Los Angeles, California.

Marion Howard Dunham died in Los Angeles, December 27, 1921, and was buried at Forest Lawn Cemetery, December 31, 1921.

Notes

References

External links
 

1842 births
1921 deaths
People from Geauga County, Ohio
People from Burlington, Iowa
Woman's Christian Temperance Union people
American temperance activists
Educators from Ohio
American suffragists
American socialists
Wikipedia articles incorporating text from A Woman of the Century
American Christian socialists
Female Christian socialists